Tonia Sotiropoulou (born 28 April 1987) is a Greek actress.

Personal life 
In October 2021 Sotiropoulou wed Greek singer-songwriter Kostis Maraveyas also known by his stage name Maraveyas ilegál.

Filmography

Film

Television

References

Tonia Sotiropoulou lands enviable role as the first Greek Bond girl

External links

1987 births
Actresses from Athens
Living people
Greek emigrants to the United Kingdom
21st-century Greek actresses
Greek film actresses